Garae-tteok is a long, cylindrical tteok (rice cake) made with non-glutinous rice flour. Grilled garae-tteok is sometimes sold as street food. Thinly (and usually diagonally) sliced garae-tteok is used for making tteokguk (rice cake soup), a traditional dish eaten during the celebration of the Korean New Year.

Preparation 
It is traditionally made by steaming non-glutinous rice flour in siru (steamer), pounding it and rolling it between the palms and the table or rolling it between the palms. Hand-rolled garae-tteok is not uniform in size and has variations of thickness along its length.

Modern garae-tteok is usually made by extruding the steamed rice flour with garae-tteok machines.

See also 
 Tteok-bokki

References 

Street food in South Korea
Tteok